Javier "Javi" Pérez de Lucía Burgos (born 29 March 1996) is a Spanish footballer who most recently played for Los Angeles FC in Major League Soccer.

Career

Youth & College
Pérez joined Valencia aged 5-years old and played at youth levels through the club for 15 years. He spent time on loan with lower league sides Hospitalet and UD Alzira, before been released by Valencia and spending a short spell with CD Buñol.

Pérez later moved to the United States to study and play college soccer at the University of Pittsburgh between 2017 and 2018.

Professional 
On 14 January 2019, Pérez was selected 64th overall in the 2019 MLS SuperDraft by Los Angeles FC. He signed with Los Angeles on 10 March 2019.

On 14 March 2019, Pérez was loaned to USL Championship side Phoenix Rising for the 2019 season.

References

External links 
 Javi Perez at Pittsburgh Panthers
 
 Javier Perez at Los Angeles FC

1996 births
Living people
Association football midfielders
Expatriate soccer players in the United States
Los Angeles FC draft picks
Los Angeles FC players
Pittsburgh Panthers men's soccer players
Phoenix Rising FC players
Spanish expatriate footballers
Spanish footballers
Footballers from Valencia (city)
USL Championship players
USL League Two players
Valencia CF players